Jesús Fernández Alonso (born 1 March 2000) is a Spanish footballer who plays for Polvorín FC as either a central defender or a central midfielder.

Club career
Fernández was born in Anleo, Navia, Asturias, and represented Sporting de Gijón and CD Lugo as a youth. He made his senior debut with the farm team on 25 August 2019, starting in a 1–0 Tercera División away loss against Arosa SC.

Fernández scored his first senior goal on 5 December 2020, netting the opener in a 4–1 away routing of Deportivo Fabril. The following 2 July, he renewed his contract for two years.

Fernández made his first team debut on 27 August 2022, starting in a 1–0 home win over CD Leganés in the Segunda División.

References

External links

2000 births
Living people
Spanish footballers
Footballers from Asturias
Association football defenders
Association football midfielders
Segunda División players
Tercera División players
Tercera Federación players
Polvorín FC players
CD Lugo players